The International  Journal of Psychoanalytic Psychotherapy  was a peer-reviewed scientific journal of psychiatry and psychotherapy published by the International Journal Press and Jason Aronson from 1974 until 1985.

It was formed by the merger of the International Journal of Psychiatry  published by the International Science Press from 1965 until 1973, and the International Journal of Child Psychotherapy published by the International Journal Press from 1972 until 1973.
At some point or another during their respective existences, all three titles were included in the Science Citation Index and PubMed/MEDLINE.

See also 
 List of psychiatry journals
 List of psychotherapy journals

References

Psychotherapy journals
Publications established in 1974
Publications disestablished in 1985
English-language journals
Psychoanalysis journals